Spanish flu or Spanish influenza, also known as purulent bronchitis, may refer to:

 the 1918 flu pandemic where 500 million people worldwide were infected with H1N1 influenza A virus between 1918 and 1920, killing from 20 to 100 million people
 the Influenza A virus subtype H1N1 which caused the influenza pandemic between 1918 and 1920, as well as the 2009 swine flu pandemic and 1977 Russian flu pandemic

See also

 Flu (disambiguation) 
 Influenzavirus, the viruses that cause influenza disease
 Influenza pandemic, "the influenza" global mass disease for a given year